= California Academy of Distinguished Neutrals =

California Academy of Distinguished Neutrals

The California Academy of Distinguished Neutrals is the Californian chapter of the National Academy of Distinguished Neutrals.

Membership is limited to California neutrals who have substantial experience in the resolution of commercial and civil disputes, and who have been recognized for their accomplishments through the Academy's peer-nomination and extensive attorney client review process.

As of December 2007, only 120 such attorneys have been recognized by the group, less than 5% of the state's neutrals.
